Alnwick Infirmary  is a community hospital in Alnwick, Northumberland, England. It is managed by Northumbria Healthcare NHS Foundation Trust.

History
The infirmary was established by William Davison as the Alnwick Dispensary "for the prompt and judicious aid of medicines and medical advice" in 1815. The medical school Davison set up in his pharmacy premises was noted throughout the North of England. It became Alnwick Infirmary in 1849 and joined the National Health Service in 1948.

References

Hospitals in Northumberland
NHS hospitals in England